The Women's Individual Time Trial at the 2007 UCI Road World Championships took place on September 26. The Championships were hosted by the German city of Stuttgart, and featured two laps of an urban circuit, amounting to 25.1 kilometres of racing against the clock. Three-time world cyclo-cross champion Hanka Kupfernagel bested defending world time-trial champion Kristin Armstrong and the rest of the field.

Final classification

References
Results
Race website
cyclingnews

Women's Time Trial
UCI Road World Championships – Women's time trial
2007 in women's road cycling